I Don't Wanna is a retrospective album released in 2005 on Locust Music consisting of demos recorded in 1966 by Henry Flynt & The Insurrections, a garage rock protest group led by Flynt on lead vocals and electric guitar, Walter De Maria on drums, Art Murphy on keyboards, and Paul Breslin on upright bass.

The music on I Don't Wanna is primarily a rockabilly and delta blues-inspired exercise in experimental primitivism, characterized by politically radical agitprop lyrics.

Background

History
Henry Flynt & the Insurrections were led by musician and philosopher Henry Flynt, who was a classically trained violinist. Flynt, a native of North Carolina, was living in New York City during the 1960s and had come into contact with many of the conceptual, "Fluxus", and avant-garde artists and musicians living there at the time, including La Monte Young, before starting his own group.

Flynt, who had initially been trained on guitar by Lou Reed briefly joined the Velvet Underground in 1966 substituting for John Cale, at his suggestion, while Cale was suffering from an illness.  During that time Lou Reed gave him his first guitar lessons. Flynt had been interested in writing songs with political messages, inspired by Bob Dylan's "Subterranean Homesick Blues", so he began assembling an act of his own influenced by rock music and blues. The Insurrections started as a duo with Flynt as the vocalist and electric guitarist. He was accompanied by Walter De Maria, a sculptor and friend, on drums, who had formerly played in the Primitives, an earlier garage rock combo that included Lou Reed.

The duo specialized in a kind of agitprop approach to topical songs as they evolved into a larger group, eventually adding jazz musician Paul Breslin on upright bass and organist Art Murphy, and taking the name Henry Flynt & the Insurrections.  Many of the band's songs were highly satirical, rife with references to topics such as "napalm", "Uncle Sam", and "CIA-backed coups".  They recorded songs onto rehearsal demos in 1966, but, due to Flynt and DeMaira's wariness of commercial success, the material was not released until years later.  The band broke up shortly thereafter. The group's demo tapes were re-issued in 2004 as the album I Don't Wanna, on Locust Music.

Music

The opening cut on I Don't Wanna is the delta blues-tinged "Uncle Sam Do", a highly sarcastic diatribe against the Vietnam War, and establishes the characteristically caustic mood that extends throughout the whole set. The second track, "Goodbye Wall St." takes dead-center aim at capitalism. The lyrics to "Go Down" depict a picket line in which the target of anger is not only directed at the war and social inequality, but seemingly provides blank slate for whatever particular grievance that comes to mind.  "Jumping", though not topical, is the most experimental cut stylistically, featuring a heavily reverbed high-pitched saxophone accompanied manic guitar strumming.  The penultimate cut is the album's theme song, "I Don't Wanna", another anti-war protest.  The album concludes with "Dreams Away", which manages to stretch delta blues motifs into a musically experimental context.

Reception

In Records Ruin the Landscape: John Cage, the Sixties, and Sound Recording, David Grubbs describes the Henry Flynt & the Insurrections sound as "garage-punk protest". Their posthumously released I Don't Wanna was listed as Julian Cope's Album of the Month, not long after its release. Cope comments: "This album reveals such an astonishing quicksilver energy of interplay between the guitar and drums that it all sounds contemporary even today". Eugene Chadbourne wrote a generally positive review for AllMusic, pointing out some weaker cuts, but he states that "on the whole the nine tracks here add up to a vision of rock music that most listeners will be perfectly happy to have in their heads for a while..."

Track listing
All songs are written by Henry Flynt.

 "Uncle Sam Do" – 2:52  
 "Good by Wall St." – 2:59  
 "Go Down" – 2:55
 "Corona Del Mar" – 3:00  
 "Missionary Stew" – 4:30   
 "Jumping" – 3:03   
 "Sky Turned Red" – 2:33   
 "I Don't Wanna" – 3:18
 "Dreams Away" – 7:29

Musicians
Henry Flynt – vocals and electric guitar
Walter De Maria – drums
Art Murphy – keyboards
Paul Breslin – upright bass

References

1966 albums
Henry Flynt & the Insurrections albums